Sunset Ridge Country Club is a private country club located in Cook County, just outside the city limits of Northfield, Illinois, a suburb of Chicago.

Founded in 1923 and renovated in 2005, it features a 6,752 yard 18-hole course.  Sunset Ridge features a course rating of 73.0 and a slope of 133. It has hosted the Western Open in 1972 and the Women's Western Open in 1935. The Club will host the 2018 Western Amateur Championship. The greens are made of a bent grass while the fairways are also made of a bent grass. This facility used to offer a four-hole par 3 course that is primarily for children.

References

External links
 Country club history
 Golf.com
 Golfnow.com
 http://www.jacobsongolfcoursedesign.com/work.html
 https://betting1010.com/18clubsg/

Sports venues in Cook County, Illinois
Golf clubs and courses in Illinois
Sports venues completed in 1923
1923 establishments in Illinois